Parotocinclus amazonensis is a species of catfish in the family Loricariidae. It is native to South America, where it occurs in the Amazon River basin in areas with a pH of 6.0 to 7.0 and a dH range of 5 to 15. The species reaches 2.5 cm (1 inch) in total length.

References 

Loricariidae
Otothyrinae
Fish described in 1977